The 1952 United States Senate election in Florida was held on November 4, 1952. Incumbent Senator Spessard Holland was easily re-elected to a second term in office.

General election

Results

See also 
 1952 United States Senate elections

References 

Single-candidate elections
1952
Florida
United States Senate